National Highway 627, commonly referred to as NH 627 is a national highway in  India. It is a spur road of National Highway 27. NH-627 traverses the state of Assam in India.

Route 
Nelle(Amsoi Gate), Rajagaon, Doyangmukh, Umrangso, Khobak, Harangajao.

Junctions  

  Terminal near Nelle.
  Terminal near Harangajao.

See also 

 List of National Highways in India
 List of National Highways in India by state

References

External links 

 NH 627 on OpenStreetMap

National highways in India
National Highways in Assam